False balance, also bothsidesism, is a media bias in which journalists present an issue as being more balanced between opposing viewpoints than the evidence supports. Journalists may present evidence and arguments out of proportion to the actual evidence for each side, or may omit information that would establish one side's claims as baseless. False balance has been cited as a cause of misinformation.

False balance is a bias which usually stems from an attempt to avoid bias and gives unsupported or dubious positions an illusion of respectability. It creates a public perception that some issues are scientifically contentious, though in reality they may not be, therefore creating doubt about the scientific state of research, and can be exploited by interest groups such as corporations like the fossil fuel industry or the tobacco industry, or ideologically motivated activists such as vaccination opponents or creationists.

Examples of false balance in reporting on science issues include the topics of human-caused climate change versus natural climate variability, the health effects of tobacco, the alleged relation between thiomersal and autism, alleged negative side effects of the HPV vaccine, and evolution versus intelligent design.

Description and origin
False balance emerges from the ideal of journalistic objectivity, where factual news is presented in a way that allows the reader to make determinations about how to interpret the facts, and interpretations or arguments around those facts are left to the opinion pages. Because many newsworthy events have two or more opposing camps making competing claims, news media is responsible for reporting all (credible or reasonable) opposing positions, along with verified facts that may support one or the other side of an issue. At one time, when false balance was prevalent, news media sometimes reported all positions as though they were equally credible, even though the facts clearly contradicted a position, or there was a substantial consensus on one side of an issue, and only a fringe or nascent theory supporting the other side.

Today, most media is willing to call out false information as incorrect, such as the idea that the Earth is not warming, or that Donald Trump won the 2020 United States presidential election; in contrast to prior decades, media will now regularly call the idea that Trump won the election a "lie" or "the big lie." Similarly, claims that the Earth is not warming are regularly referred to in news (vs only editorials) as "denial," "misleading," or "debunked."  Prior to this shift, media would sometimes list all positions, without clarifying that one position is known or generally-agreed to be false.

Unlike most other media biases, false balance may stem from an attempt to avoid bias; producers and editors may confuse treating competing views fairly—i.e., in proportion to their actual merits and significance—with treating them equally, giving them equal time to present their views even when those views may be known beforehand to be based on false information. Media would then present two opposing viewpoints on an issue as equally credible, or to present a major issue on one side of a debate as having the same weight as a minor one on the other. False balance can also originate from other motives such as sensationalism, where producers and editors may feel that a story portrayed as a contentious debate will be more commercially successful than a more accurate (or widely-agreed) account of the issue.

Science journalist Dirk Steffens mocked the practice as comparable to inviting a flat earther to debate with an astrophysicist over the shape of the Earth, as if the truth could be found somewhere in the middle. Liz Spayd of The New York Times wrote: "The problem with false balance doctrine is that it masquerades as rational thinking."

Examples

Climate change

Although the scientific community almost unanimously attributes a majority of the global warming since 1950 to the effects of the Industrial Revolution, there are a very small number – a few dozen scientists out of tens of thousands – who dispute the conclusion. Giving equal voice to scientists on both sides makes it seem like there is a serious disagreement within the scientific community, when in fact there is an overwhelming scientific consensus on climate change that anthropogenic global warming exists.

MMR vaccine controversy

Observers have criticized the involvement of mass media in the controversy, what is known as "science by press conference", alleging that the media provided Andrew Wakefield's study with more credibility than it deserved. A March 2007 paper in BMC Public Health by Shona Hilton, Mark Petticrew, and Kate Hunt postulated that media reports on Wakefield's study had "created the misleading impression that the evidence for the link with autism was as substantial as the evidence against". Earlier papers in Communication in Medicine and the British Medical Journal concluded that media reports provided a misleading picture of the level of support for Wakefield's hypothesis.

See also
 Argument to moderation
 Centrism
 FCC fairness doctrine
 Golden mean
 Horseshoe theory
 Journalistic objectivity
 Manufactured controversy
 Merchants of Doubt
 View from nowhere

References

External links

Bias
News media manipulation
Error
Barriers to critical thinking